Scolia hirta is a species of wasp in the subfamily Scoliinae of the family Scoliidae .

Distribution
This species is present in most of mediterranean and central Europe, in the eastern Palearctic realm, in the Near East, and in North Africa.

Description
The wings have a smoky-dark color, with blue reflexes. Antennae of males - composed of 13 segments - are longer than in females (12 segments ). Moreover males have three large spines at the tip of their abdomen.

This species is rather similar to Scolia sexmaculata, that shows two yellow spots, or even three, instead of two yellow stripes.

Biology
They can be encountered from July through September feeding on flowers, with a preference for flowers appearing cyan or blue to bees eyes and for composite flowers or aggregated inflorescences.

Among the most visited families there are Caprifoliaceae (Knautia arvensis), Asteraceae (Jacobaea vulgaris, Solidago canadensis, Solidago virgaurea, Centaurea scabiosa, Echinops spp.),  Lamiaceae (Thymus serpyllum, Pycnanthemum spp.), Crassulaceae and Liliaceae. Furthermore they also visit Veronica spicata (Scrophulariaceae), Eryngium planum (Apiaceae), Jasione montana (Campanulaceae).

These massive solitary wasps dig in search of larvae of beetles (Cetoniidae species, especially Cetonia aurata, as well as Scarabaeidae species). Then they parasitize the larvae and lay eggs in them for feeding their offspring.

Subspecies
Subspecies include:
Scolia hirta subsp. hirta  (Schrank, 1781) 
Scolia hirta subsp. unifasciata  Cyrillo, 1787   (in Corsica, Sicily and Malta)

References

Insects described in 1781
Scoliidae